Frank Small (April 18, 1895 – January 1971) was an American cyclist. He competed in the men's 50km event at the 1920 Summer Olympics.

References

External links
 

1895 births
1971 deaths
American male cyclists
Olympic cyclists of the United States
Cyclists at the 1920 Summer Olympics
Sportspeople from Brooklyn